Deh-e Sheykhan (also Romanized as Deh-e Sheykhān and Deh Shikan) is a village in Valanjerd Rural District, in the Central District of Borujerd County, Lorestan Province, Iran. At the 2006 census, its population was 386, in 101 families.

References 

Towns and villages in Borujerd County